Elecions for the president, vice-president, members of the Senate, members of the House of Representatives and local positions were held on April 23, 1946, pursuant to Commonwealth Act No. 725

Background
Soon after the reconstitution of the Commonwealth government in 1945, Senators Manuel Roxas, Elpidio Quirino and their allies called for an early national election to choose the president and vice president of the Philippines and members of the Congress. In December 1945, the House Insular Affairs Committee of the United States Congress approved the joint resolution setting the date of the election on not later than April 30, 1946.

Prompted by this congressional action, President Sergio Osmeña called the Philippine Congress to a three-day special session. Congress enacted Commonwealth Act No. 725, setting the date of the election on April 23, 1946. The act was signed by Osmeña on January 5, 1946.

Candidates
Three parties presented their respective candidates for the different national elective positions. These were the Nacionalista PartyConservative (Osmeña) Wing, the Liberal Wing of the Nacionalista Party, and the Partido Modernista. The Nacionalistas had Osmeña and Senator Eulogio Rodriguez as their candidates for president and vice president, respectively. The Modernistas chose Hilario Camino Moncado and Luis Salvador for the same positions. The standard bearers of the Liberals were Senators Manuel Roxas and Elpidio Quirino.

On January 3, 1946, President Osmeña announced his candidacy for the presidency. On January 22, Eulogio Rodriguez was nominated as Osmeña's running mate for vice president, in a convention held at Ciro's Club in Manila. According to the Manila Chronicle:

The convention opened at 10:15 in the morning when the acting secretary of the party, Vicente Farmoso, called the confab to order.

<blockquote>Congressman Jose C. Romero, who delivered the keynote speech accused Senate President Manuel Roxas and his followers of fanning the flames of discontent among the people, of capitalizing on the people's hardship, and of minimizing the accomplishment of the [Osmeña] Administration. These men with the Messiah complex have been the bane of the country and of the world. This is the mentality that produces Hitlers and the Mussolinis, and their desire to climb to power. they even want to destroy the party which placed them where they are today.</blockquote>

Senator Carlos P. Garcia, who delivered the nomination speech for President Sergio Osmeña, made a long recital of Osmeña's achievements, his virtues as public official and as private citizen.

Entering the convention hall at about 7:30 p.m, President Osmeña, accompanied by the committee on notification, was greeted with rounds of cheer and applause as he ascended the platform. President Osmeña delivered his speech which was a general outline of his future plans once elected. He emphasized that as far as his party is concerned, independence is a close issue. It is definitely coming on July 4, 1946

On January 19, 1946, Senator Roxas announced his candidacy for the presidency in a convention held in Santa Ana Cabaret in Manila. According to Manila Chronicle:
...more than three thousand (by conservative estimate there were only 1,000 plus) delegates, party members and hero worshipers jammed into suburban, well known Santa Ana Cabaret (biggest in the world) to acclaim ex-katipunero and Bagong Katipunan organizer Manuel Acuña Roxas as the guidon bearer of the Nacionalista Party's Liberal Wing. 

The delegates, who came from all over the Islands, met in formal convention from 10:50 am and did not break up till about 5:30 pm.

They elected 1. Mariano J. Cuenco, professional Osmeñaphobe, as temporary chairman; 2. Jose Avelino and ex-pharmacist Antonio Zacarias permanent chairman and secretary, respectively; 3. nominated forty-four candidates for senators; 4. heard the generalissimo himself deliver an oratorical masterpiece consisting of 50 per cent attacks against the (Osmeña) Administration, 50 per cent promises, pledges. Rabid Roxasites greeted the Roxas acceptance speech with hysterical applause.

President Osmeña tried to prevent the split in the Nacionalista Party by offering Senator Roxas the position of Philippine Regent Commissioner to the United States but the latter turned down the offer.

As a result of the split among the members of the Nacionalista Party, owing to marked differenced of opinion on certain vital issues of which no settlement had been reached, a new political organization was born and named the Liberal Wing of the Nacionalista Party, which would later become the Liberal Party.

Results
The election was generally peaceful and orderly except in some places where passions ran high, especially in the province of Pampanga. According to the controversial decision of the Electoral Tribunal of the House of Representatives on Meliton Soliman vs. Luis Taruc, Pampanga was under the terroristic clutches and control of the Hukbalahaps.So terrorized were the people of Arayat, at one time, 200 persons abandoned their homes, their work, and their food, all their belongings in a mass evacuation to the poblacion due to fear and terror.''

A total of 2,218,847 voters went to the polls to elect their president and vice president, who were also to be the commonwealth's last and the republic's first.

Four days after election day, the Liberal candidates were proclaimed victors. Roxas registered an overwhelming majority of votes in 34 provinces and nine cities: Abra, Agusan, Albay, Antique, Bataan, Batanes, Batangas, Bukidnon, 
Bulacan, Cagayan, Camarines Norte, Camarines Sur, Capiz, Cavite, Cotabato, Ilocos Norte, Ilocos Sur, Isabela, Laguna, La Union, Leyte, Marinduque, Mindoro, Misamis Oriental, Negros Occidental, Nueva Vizcaya, Palawan, Pangasinan, Rizal, Romblon, Samar, Sorsogon, Sulu, Surigao, Tayabas, Zambales, Manila, Quezon City, Bacolod (Negros Occidental), Iloilo City (Iloilo), Baguio (Mountain Province), Zamboanga City (Zamboanga), Tagaytay (Cavite), Cavite City (Cavite) and San Pablo City (Laguna)

Likewise, the Liberals won nine out of 16 contested senatorial seats.

In the House of Representatives, the Liberals won an overwhelming majority with 50 seats while the Nacionalistas and the Democratic Alliance only got 33 and six seats, respectively.

President

Vice-President

Senate

The first eight Senators would serve until 1951, and the second eight until 1949:

House of Representatives

See also
Commission on Elections
Politics of the Philippines
Philippine elections
President of the Philippines
1st Congress of the Philippines

References

External links
 The Philippine Presidency Project
 Official website of the Commission on Elections

1946
General election
April 1946 events in Asia